El Platanar Airport  is an airport serving the town of El Platanar in San Miguel Department, El Salvador.

See also

Transport in El Salvador
List of airports in El Salvador

References

External links
 OpenStreetMap - El Platanar
World Airport Codes - El Platanar Airport
 HERE/Nokia - El Platanar

Airports in El Salvador